The 2003 Monmouth Hawks football team represented Monmouth University in the 2003 NCAA Division I-AA football season as a member of the Northeast Conference (NEC). The Hawks were led by 11th-year head coach Kevin Callahan and played their home games at Kessler Field. Despite having just one regular season loss, the Hawks did not receive an invitation to participate in the NCAA Division I-AA postseason.

Schedule

References

Monmouth
Monmouth Hawks football seasons
Northeast Conference football champion seasons
Monmouth Hawks football